Graeme Horne (born 22 March 1985) is a former English rugby league footballer who last played as a  forward for the Doncaster R.L.F.C. in Betfred Championship.; he retired at the end of the 2020 season.

He previously played for Hull FC, Huddersfield Giants and Hull Kingston Rovers.

Background
Horne was born in Kingston upon Hull, Humberside, England.

He is the younger brother of former Great Britain international Richard Horne.

Playing career

Club career

Hull FC

Horne signed for Hull F.C. when he was 17 years old, making his Super League début in 2003. He missed out on the matchday squad for their 2005 Challenge Cup Final victory, but did play at Wembley Stadium in the Challenge Cup Final against St. Helens in 2008.

Hull reached the 2006 Super League Grand final to be contested against St. Helens, and Horne played from the interchange bench in his side's 4-26 loss.

Huddersfield Giants
He left Hull in 2010 to join Huddersfield, playing for two seasons before returning to the city of Hull to join Hull Kingston Rovers.

Hull KR
Horne joined Hull KR from the 2012 season.

York City Knights
In November 2017 Horne signed a one-year deal with York having previously played for the club on dual registration.

Doncaster

International career

England
Horne played two games for England in 2006.

Scotland
Horne has also represented Scotland.

References

External links
York City Knights profile
Hull KR profile

1985 births
Living people
Doncaster R.L.F.C. players
England national rugby league team players
English people of Scottish descent
English rugby league players
Huddersfield Giants players
Hull F.C. players
Hull Kingston Rovers players
Rugby league five-eighths
Rugby league fullbacks
Rugby league halfbacks
Rugby league second-rows
Rugby league utility players
Rugby league players from Kingston upon Hull
Scotland national rugby league team players  
York City Knights players